The State of Maryland Commendation Medal is an award in the state of Maryland to honor exceptional service to the state by members of the Maryland National Guard or military, active or former.

References

Awards and decorations of the National Guard (United States)